The Anarchist International of St. Imier  was an international workers' organization formed in 1872 after the split in the First International between the anarchists and the Marxists. This followed the 'expulsions' of Mikhail Bakunin and James Guillaume from the First International at the Hague Congress. It attracted some affiliates of the First International, repudiated the Hague resolutions, and adopted a Bakuninist programme, and lasted until 1877.

History 

The St. Imier International was created when the Swiss Jura Federation, the most important anarchist section of the old International Workingmen's Association (IWA), sent a proposal to the other sections, several of which then assembled at St. Imier to create a new anti-authoritarian organization. The organization was made up of various national federations of workers' societies, mainly the Italian, Spanish, Belgian, American, French and French-speaking Swiss federations, together with other individual organizations which all opposed Karl Marx's control of the General Council and favoured the autonomy of national sections from centralized control.

The Congress of Saint-Imier (September, 1872) 
The Hague Congress decided to expel Mikhail Bakunin and James Guillaume from the International for not having dissolved the International Alliance of Socialist Democracy, which caused the delegates from the Jurassic, Belgian and Spanish federations, together with a Dutch and a Swiss delegate, to sign a manifesto showing their disagreement. All of them, including Giuseppe Fanelli and Errico Malatesta, decided to meet in Saint-Imier to hold a separate Congress in which they rejected the expulsion of Bakunin and Guillaume, did not recognize the General Council appointed in The Hague and approved a resolution that included the anarchist theses and that contradicted the policy defended by the IWA. The resolution on the political action of the proletariat said:

The Congress, held on 15–16 September 1872, also approved the so-called "Pact of Friendship, Solidarity, and Mutual Defense between Free Federations" (also known as Saint-Imier Pact) in which it was said that:

The delegates also proclaimed:

The Congress of Geneva (September, 1873) 
In September 1873 the International held its Second Congress in Geneva (officially the Sixth General Congress since it was considered the legitimate heir to the IWA founded in London in 1864). It coincided with the Congress held by the Marxists in the same city, although theirs was a failure since only a small number of regional federations participated and the General Council could not attend due to lack of funds. On the other hand, the Anarchist Congress, inaugurated on September 1, was attended by delegates from Britain, Switzerland, France, the Netherlands, Belgium and Spain. A federation from the United States also announced its accession.

Congress agreed to the dissolution of the General Council and it was proposed that the next Congress be held in Spain, but the Spanish delegate José García Viñas opposed it because he thought that within a year "Spain will be in full social revolution or in full reaction." Regarding the issues that were debated, he highlighted the general strike issue, with which, according to the proposal, "the revolutionary solidarity between the different localities and regions would be effective; understanding that the workers should be ready to go on strike to prevent the concentration of the forces of the bourgeoisie on the points or regions where a revolutionary movement would break out." On this subject Congress agreed as follows:

The Congresses of Brussels (1874), Bern (1876) and Verviers (1877) 
The next two congresses were held in Brussels between September 7 and 13, 1874 and in Bern in October 1876. In the latter a proposal was debated to open the following congress to delegates from non-anarchist organizations, which was opposed by the representatives of the Italian and Spanish federations if the following principle was not accepted: "The International is the only existing organization that truly represents popular socialism; therefore we believe that our Association should be represented in the socialist congress, not to merge into a new organization, but only to defend its principles and its means of action and try to attract the workers' organizations that have not yet entered its ranks." Once this was approved, a comprehensive Congress was convened to be held in September 1877 in Ghent, although shortly before that the Anarchist International would meet in Verviers. Regarding the convocation of the comprehensive congress in Ghent from which "a new International could result," a clandestine Spanish anarchist newspaper warned that "such a thing would be tantamount to supposing that the congress, forgetting the lofty mission entrusted to it, would occupy itself with such perfectly superfluous things as how to claim the formation of a new International, since it exists, it has its magnificent organization and its circle is wide enough to accommodate all men of good will and all workers' organizations that aspire to the complete emancipation of the proletariat."

The Congresses of Verviers and Ghent held between September 6 and 8, 1877, the first, and then the second, were the last of the Anarchist International since "they failed to obtain the attendance of many representatives of the workers' societies". In Verviers, the radicalization of the anarchist movement was observed, increasingly inclined towards positions favorable to the use of violence under the influence of Russian populism and nihilism, and which took shape in the approval of the policy of "propaganda of the deed". Hence, the congress showed its "sympathy and solidarity" with the attacks in Saint Petersburg and with the Italian insurrection in Benevento.

On the other hand, in the Congress of Verviers for the first time debate was raised between collectivist anarchism, the dominant doctrine until then in the anarchist movement - and which was based on the writings of Bakunin, who had died the previous year - and anarcho-communism defended by a new anarchist generation, including the Russian Peter Kropotkin, the Italian Errico Malatesta and the French Élisée Reclus. Thus, while the collectivists defended the principle "from each according to his ability, to each according to his work", anarcho-communists proposed the principle "from each according to his ability, to each according to his needs". In the Congress it was agreed after an intense debate that each Regional Federation would decide which option to follow. The Spanish Regional Federation, for example, remained faithful to collectivist anarchism, but anarcho-communism began to spread between certain federations and sections, especially in Andalusia.

The Spanish anarchist Anselmo Lorenzo wrote years later:

Legacy
The Anarchist International lasted until 1877, while the Marxist International had already dissolved a year earlier. In July 1881, anarchists would initiate the International Working People's Association (IWPA), or "Black International", which remained active until the late 1880s. A further attempt to create a lasting international organization was made in Amsterdam in 1907 by an International Anarchist Congress, though this would have an even briefer life than the IWPA.

Contemporary anarchist internationals include the anarcho-syndicalist International Workers' Association (established 1922), the International of Anarchist Federations (est. 1968), and Black Bridge International (est. 2001). The Anarkismo.net project (est. 2005) is not an international, but provides a means of increasing cooperation between organisations in the platformist and especifismo traditions.

In August 2012, the International Anarchism Gathering took place in St. Imier, partly as a commemoration of the 1872 St. Imier congress. Another is planned for 2023 to celebrate the 150th anniversary of the first St. Imier Congress.

Congresses
14–16 September 1872: Saint-Imier; 5th Congress
1–6 September 1873: Geneva; 6th Congress
7–12 September 1874: Brussels; 7th Congress
26–29 September 1876: Bern; 8th Congress
6–8 September 1877: Verviers; 9th Congress

Other anarchist internationals and international networks
 International Working People's Association (1881–1887)
 International Workers' Association (1922–)
 International of Anarchist Federations (1968–)
 Black Bridge International (2001–2004)
 International Libertarian Solidarity (2001–2005)
 Anarkismo.net (2005–)
 International Union of Anarchists (2011–)

See also
International Anarchist Congresses
St. Imier

References

Bibliography

External links
Le Congrès de l'Internationale Anti-autoritaire Saint Imier, 15–16 September 1872

Collectivist anarchism
1872 establishments in the Netherlands
1877 disestablishments
History of anarchism
Defunct international anarchist organizations
Organizations established in 1872
History of the canton of Bern